The Frederic and Cecilia Cuțescu-Storck  Art Museum is a modern art museum located in Bucharest, Romania, dedicated to the artists Frederic Storck and Cecilia Cuţescu-Storck.

The museum is located in the house designed by the artists with the help of architect Alexandru Clavel and constructed in 1912–1913. The artists donated their collection to the government which opened the museum in 1951. Currently, the house belongs to the brothers Alvaro and Alexandru Botez, who have agreed to lend it to The Bucharest Municipality Museum in order for the art collection to be preserved. 

The museum presents works of artists of the Storck family: Karl Storck, Carol Storck, Frederic Storck, and Cecilia Cuţescu-Storck. It also includes medieval is faher objects of Medieval religious sculptures as well as watercolours, coins and medals by Carol Szathmari.

References

Art museums and galleries in Bucharest
Historic monuments in Bucharest
Biographical museums in Romania